Pamphylian was a little-attested dialect of Ancient Greek that was spoken in Pamphylia, on the southern coast of Asia Minor. Its origins and relation to other Greek dialects are uncertain, though a number of scholars have proposed isoglosses with Arcadocypriot. It is the sole classical era dialect which did not use articles, suggesting that it split off from other dialects early. Some of its distinctive characteristics reflect potential language contact with Anatolian languages spoken nearby.

Text corpus 

Pamphylian is known from about 300 inscriptions, most of them from the Pamphylian city of Aspendos. Nearly all of them are short and funeral and consist of names only. Pamphylian graffiti giving single names have also been found abroad, in Egypt (Abydos) and Delos. The longest inscription is a 36 line decree from Aspendos, first analyzed in detail in 1880 by William M. Ramsay. Inscriptions are dated from the fifth century BCE to the Roman period, most of them being from the second century BCE.

Coins issued by Pamphylian cities also bear the script. Some 30 Pamphylian single words are known from glosses given by Hesychius, Eustathius, and the Etymologicum Magnum.

Pronunciation and writing

Pamphylia had a variant local alphabet, which was probably borrowed from other Greek alphabets: 

The Pamphylian alphabet made use both of the original Pamphylian digamma (Ͷ) and a standard digamma (Ϝ). It has been surmised that the original sound  in some environments (after vowels) was represented by Ͷ; where the sound had changed to labiodental  in the Pamphylian dialect, it was represented by Ϝ. Sometimes Ͷ also stood in the place of beta.

A conspicuous element in Pamphylian texts are double iotas, where the first iota denotes an /i/-sound and the second a glide /j/.

The Η sign usually represents a /h/-sound (rough breathing); only rarely, in a few late inscriptions, it is apparently used to represent the classical Greek eta vowel (/ɛ:/ or /i:/). 

Eustathius, quoting Heraclides, says that the Pamphylians "liked the /b/-sound so much that they often put b's in"; for example, instead of aëlios ('Sun'), they said babelios. And the Etymologicum Magnum says that they tended to swallow /s/-sounds and pronounce them as a 'hairy' (δασύς) sound, i.e., a rough breathing: instead of mousika they said mōˁika. (One may compare a similar phenomenon in the Anatolian languages, where, for example, Milyan masa, 'god', is an older counterpart of Lycian maha.)

An inscription from Perge dated to around 400 BC reads:  ('Klemutas the wasirvotas, son of Lvaramus, dedicated this to the Queen of Perge').

In eastern Pamphylia, the Pamphylian cities Side and Lyrbe-Seleukia used another language and script, called Sidetic.

Relation with the Anatolian languages 
Pamphylic Greek appears to have been heavily influenced by nearby Anatolian languages such as Lycian, Pisidian, and Sidetic, in both phonology and syntax. In morphology and lexicon, Anatolian influence apparently was much more limited. 

The phonological influence of Anatolian on Pamphylic has been characterized as "massive structural interference", affecting both the consonant and vowel repertoire. Aspirates gave way to fricatives, as did stop consonants.

In syntax three specific peculiarities stand out: absence of the article "the", use of the dative with pre- and postpositions where other Greeks would use a genitive, and the use of a special expression και νι + imperative.

All of these features can be explained as an adaption of the Greek language by imperfect second-language speakers: if a small group of colonizing Greek immigrants remained a minority in an area inhabited by Anatolian speaking people, the heavily accented Greek spoken as a second language by the local population, coloured by their native Anatolian language, would become the norm in the area. Because Pamphylia was an isolated region ("a backwater, relatively inaccessible"), there were few external stimuli to later change this situation.

Glossary
/ – 'solar' (Attic:)
/ – Adonis
/ – 'sacrificial victims' (Attic: 'the driven ones')
/ – 'priest' (Attic: , Cf. )
/Aêdôn or / – 'Athena'
/ – 'eagle' (Attic:)
/ – 'mentha' (Attic:)
/
/ – 'locust' (Attic:)
/ – 'sun' (Cretan and Doric: , ; Laconian: , ; Aeolic: , ; Ionic: , ; Attic: helios)
/ – 'oxen, cattle'?
/ – 'willing' (/ – 'they wanted to'
/ – 'vineyard'
/ – 'Aspendios' or 'Aspendian'
/ – 'years' (Locrian, Elean,)
/ – 'distress' (genitive of ).
/ – 'weasel, skunk, cat or member of Felidae' (Attic: , ;)
/ – imp. 'they should go'
/ – 'thunnus' (Attic: ,)
/ (?)
/ – 'bird or rooster'
/ – 'temple (anatomy)' (Attic)
/ – 'Daphne'
/ – 'turnip' (Attic:)
/ – 'in' or 'one' (Attic:  or )
/ – 'rush forward'
/ – 'five' (Attic: , ; Modern Greek: , informal )
/ – 'he gave' (Aeolic:  for Attic )
/ – 'field or farm'
/ – 'small fish, picarel, or maenidae' (Attic:)
/ – 'partridge' (Attic:)
/
/ – 'clothing'  (Attic: himation, ; Koine:  or  meaning 'garment of drill or ticking')
/ – 'army' (Attic: ,  meaning 'reunion' or 'gathering')
/ – 'lady-goddess' (Homeric:  see wanax;  'dedicated it to her')
/ – 'house' (Cretan and Locrian:)
/
/ – 'light'
/ (Attic: , 'Medean road')
/ – 'twenty' (Aeolian,).

Onomasticon
Source: Brixhe, Dialecte grec de Pamphylie

  and 
 
   
 
 
 
 , 
 
 
 
   also in Cypriot names
 
  (Cf. Cypriot: ,  from Homeric  meaning 'good', 'brave')
 
 
 
 
  – wanax + anêr
   
 
 
 
 
 
   
 
  – 'little girl'
    'Aspendian'
 
 
 
 
 
  (Attic:  and  )
 
 
 
 
 
 
 
 
 

See also

Arcadocypriot Greek
Ancient Greek dialects
Anatolian languages

References

Sources
Panayotou, A. "Pamphylian" (Maria Chritē and Maria Arapopoulou. A History of Ancient Greek: From the Beginnings to Late Antiquity. Cambridge University Press, 2007 , pp. 427–432). Article in Greek: Παμφυλιακή.
Hesychius of Alexandria

Varieties of Ancient Greek
Greek
Greek